No. 24 Squadron, named the Blinders, is an electronic warfare unit of the Pakistan Air Force.

History

The squadron was established at PAF Base Peshawar in December 1962 and was equipped with the RB-57B Rivet Flash, an electronic surveillance variant of the B-57 Canberra bomber, to fulfill the role of providing electronic intelligence of areas around Pakistan. The squadron personnel were drawn from No. 31 Bomber Wing, which was operating the PAF's B-57 Canberras, and the first squadron commander was Squadron Leader Muhammed Iqbal. Six months were spent completing a ground training course and training on the electronic surveillance equipment with two members of the squadron completing some training in the United States. In March 1964, the United States Air Force began a strategic reconnaissance operation code-named Little Cloud and deployed the two prototypes of the Martin/General Dynamics RB-57F Canberra  to Peshawar, where they were maintained and flown by PAF personnel.

The 1965 Indo-Pak War saw the Blinders flying several electronic support measures (ESM) missions to assist with counter-air sorties by other PAF squadrons. In one mission, Squadron Leader M. Iqbal and his navigator Squadron Leader Saifullah Khan Lodhi provided ESM for a strike against an Indian radar station at Amritsar by PAF F-86 Sabres.

After the 1965 Indo-Pak War the squadron conducted several more sorties deep into Indian territory. Soon after the war in October 1965, Squadron Leader Rashid Mir flew an RB-57B over Agra, while being monitored by another B-57 from a large distance. The Indian Air Force attempted to engage Sqn Ldr Mir's aircraft over Agra with SA-2 Guideline surface-to-air missile but the missile exploded on launch. Another attempt was made to intercept Sqn Ldr Mir by Indian MiG-21s over the area of Pathankot/Amritsar. The aircraft was again attacked by an SA-2 Guideline missile over Ambala and this time the shockwave of the missile's warhead was reported by Sqn Ldr Mir to have buffeted the aircraft, caused an engine to flame-out and shattered the windshield with a fragment of debris. The aircraft began losing height and Indian MiG-21s again attempted to intercept, but Sqn Ldr Mir managed to reach Pakistani airspace and the Indian interceptors stopped pursuing him upon them detecting PAF F-104 Starfighters. The damaged aircraft was landed by Mir, though severely damaged.

The only aircraft left was destroyed in its hangar during a night bombing raid by IAF on 6 December in the 1971 war.

The squadron was disbanded circa 1977.

In 1987 the Blinders were re-established and equipped with two Dassault Falcon DA-20 aircraft fitted with an electronic warfare suite, tasked with providing ESM and ECM support to other PAF squadrons. Electronic warfare missions provide data which is analysed by EW officers to compile an enemy's electronic order of battle and evaluate their tactics. Electronics and Air Defence officers are also trained in electronic warfare concepts, equipment, and operational tactics by the squadron.

In various exercises the squadron's aircraft have provided Airborne Early Warning of intruding aircraft to participating squadrons, as well as communications jamming, radar jamming, and radar spoofing. They have been used to expose PAF aircrews to operating under degraded environments and train pilots and controllers in ECM. Lectures have been delivered on the capabilities of their DA-20 electronic warfare variant. The squadron's aircraft have been involved in almost all PAF air defence exercises, as well as various joint Army and Navy exercises. Susceptibility of army and navy systems to electronic warfare has been analysed during these exercises.

During the international exercises Inspired Alert 94, Inspired Alert 95, and Sea Spark 95, the squadron's electronic support measures equipment has been employed to gain intelligence on radar capabilities and tactics used by aircraft of participating countries. As well as international exercises, the squadron flies extensively during Indian military exercises to ensure complete coverage. Aircraft of the Blinders squadron form an integral part of trans-frontier photo reconnaissance missions flown by the PAF's reconnaissance aircraft, providing protection and early warning.

From late 2004 until mid-2007 each of the squadron's Falcon 20 aircraft spent around 16 months in France for deep overhauls and upgrades. An additional aircraft (VIP configured since induction) was introduced circa 2008 to the squadron inventory. The three aircraft have associated nicknames connected with the squadron history, the original two named Iqbal and Lodhi while the third aircraft is named Mir.

Exercises

National
 Zarb-e-Momin 1989 - the unit flew 21 sorties.
 High Mark 89 - seventeen sorties flown.
 Naval ECM Exercise 1991
 High Mark 93 - fourteen sorties flown.
 Sky Guard 1994
 Jiddat 1995
 High Mark 95 - sixty-five sorties flown.
 Exercise Sea Lion 1996
 Exercise Sea Hawk 1997
 Joint Pakistan Army and Air Force exercise (1997) - army fire control radars tested with jamming.
 Saffron Bandit 1997 - thirty-five sorties flown. Pilots and controllers trained in ECM and almost all PAF units were exposed to operations in an environment degraded by EW.
 Pakistan Army exercise (1998) - Jamming operations carried out against Sky Guard radars and LAADS of the Army Air Defence System.

International
 Inspired Alert 94
 Inspired Alert 95
 Sea Spark 95

Gallery

References

Pakistan Air Force squadrons